Mirella Lapata FRSE is a computer scientist and Professor in the School of Informatics at the University of Edinburgh. Working on the general problem of extracting semantic information from large bodies of text, Lapata develops computer algorithms and models in the field of natural language processing (NLP).

Education 
Lapata obtained an Master of Arts (MA) degree from Carnegie Mellon University and subsequently earned a doctorate from the University of Edinburgh.

Career and research 
After her doctorate, Lapata assumed academic positions at Saarland University and at the Department of Computer Science at the University of Sheffield. At the University of Edinburgh she became a reader in the School of Informatics where she is a full Professor and holds a personal chair in natural language processing. Lapata is a member of the Human Communication Research Center and Institute for Language, Cognition and Computation, both in Edinburgh.

Between 2015 and 2017, Lapata served as a member of the Royal Society Machine Learning Working Group. Recently Lapata was granted a European Research Council (ERC) Consolidator Grant worth €1.9M to fund five years of her project, TransModal: Translating from Multiple Modalities into Text.

Awards and honors

 In 2009 Lapata became the first recipient of the Microsoft British Computer Society (BCS)/BCS IRSG Karen Spärck Jones Award. The award recognizes achievement in furthering the progress in information retrieval and natural language processing; the award commemorates the life and work of Karen Spärck Jones.
 In 2012 Lapata won an Empirical Methods in Natural Language Processing (EMNLP)-CoNLL 2012 Best Reviewer Award.
 In 2018 Lapata was awarded, alongside Li Dong, an Association for Computational Linguistics (ACL) Best Paper Honorable Mention.
In 2019 Lapata was elected a Fellow of the Royal Society of Edinburgh
In 2020 Lapata was elected to the Academia Europaea.

References

Academics of the University of Edinburgh
Scottish women scientists
British women computer scientists
Living people
Year of birth missing (living people)
Alumni of the University of Edinburgh
Carnegie Mellon University alumni
Fellows of the Royal Society of Edinburgh
Members of Academia Europaea
Computer scientists
Women computer scientists
Natural language processing researchers